Skenella georgiana is a species of minute sea snail, a marine gastropod mollusk in the family Cingulopsidae.

Distribution

Description 
The maximum recorded shell length is 1.22 mm.

Habitat 
Minimum recorded depth is 16 m. Maximum recorded depth is 16 m.

References

 Ponder, W. F. (1983) Rissoaform gastropods from the Antarctic and sub-Antarctic: the Eatoniellidae, Rissoidae, Barleeidae, Cingulopsidae, Orbitestellidae and Rissoellidae (Mollusca: Gastropoda) of Signy Island, South Orkney Islands, with a review of the Antarctic and sub-Antarctic (excluding southern South America and the New Zealand sub-Antarctic islands) species. British Antarctic Survey, Scientific Reports 108: 1–96

External links
 Southern Ocean Mollusc Database (SOMBASE): Skenella georgiana

Cingulopsidae
Gastropods described in 1886